The men's lightweight single sculls competition at the 2018 Asian Games in Palembang, Indonesia was held from 20 August to 24 August at the JSC Lake.

Schedule 
All times are Western Indonesia Time (UTC+07:00)

Results 
Legend
EXC — Excluded

Heats 
 Qualification: 1 → Final A (FA), 2–6 → Repechage (R)

Heat 1

Heat 2

Repechages 
 Qualification: 1–2 → Final A (FA), 3–5 → Final B (FB)

Heat 1

Heat 2

Finals

Final B

Final A

References

External links 
Rowing at the 2018 Asian Games

Rowing at the 2018 Asian Games